Grzegorz Lewandowski (born September 1, 1969) is a Polish former footballer and current coach.

Honours

Club
Legia Warsaw
Ekstraklasa (1): 1994–95 
Polish Cup (1): 1994-95
Polish SuperCup (1): 1994

International career

He played 5 times for Poland.

References

External links

1969 births
Living people
People from Szczecinek
Sportspeople from West Pomeranian Voivodeship
Polish footballers
Poland international footballers
Polish expatriate footballers
Wisła Kraków players
Ekstraklasa players
CD Logroñés footballers
La Liga players
Legia Warsaw players
Stade Malherbe Caen players
Expatriate footballers in France
Ligue 1 players
Polonia Warsaw players
Zagłębie Lubin players
RKS Radomsko players
Hutnik Nowa Huta players
Adelaide City FC players
National Soccer League (Australia) players
Gwardia Koszalin players
Kotwica Kołobrzeg footballers
Ruch Wysokie Mazowieckie players
ŁKS Łomża players
Polish football managers
Association football midfielders